Hilabaan is one of the biggest barangays in the Municipality of Dolores, Eastern, Samar. According to 2010 census, it has a population of  2,319 people in 520 households. The Barangay covers the entire island of Hilabaan on which the barrio is located, Sibay Island, Kaybani Island, Magtina, and Monbon. The barangay has two sitio: Sitio Botnga and Sitio Kaybani.

During the midst of Bagyong Ruby and Super Typhoon Yolanda, The barangay was totally devastated. And it is being neglected by the National government until now that it does not get any centavo for the Yolanda Fund for any government projects. The natives are very thankful to Rotary Club of Dasmariñas Makati for the pangkabuhayan project that they have embodied to the resident as well as The Catholic relief service for the housing project.

The first settlement of the Barangay was established on the end part of the Island "DARNASAN" , but due to it is not accessible nor it is not ideal for creating a port the native decided to transfer the barangay to 'RAWIS". As the time fly fast, the Barrio is now totally flourished while the major source of income was still deep sea fishing. The feast of Nuestra Señora Del Carmen on July 15–16  is the major event of the Barangay.

Public services 

Hiliabaan has two schools: Hilabaan National High School and Hilabaan Elementary School. It has facilities for Health through its Barangay Health Center located near the Nuestra Senyora Del Carmen Church, the patron saint of the Barrio. Its National High School was a consistent performer at DepEd yearly National Achievement.
Hilabaan Island can be reached thru pump boat or big Bangka as its mode of transportation.

Government 

Barangay Officials:
Barangay captain
Nerio Catuday
 Kagawads:
 Jerome Anabo
 Rex Cortez
 Miguel Navidad
 Ireneo Diolola Jr.
 Cornelio Para
Letty Corado
Joey Quitorio

SK Chairwoman

Krizza T. Monceda'

This page will be updated and expanded by the new Sangguniang Barangay with information agreed by their Council resolutions.

References

   4. https://psa.gov.ph/sites/default/files/08_Region%208.pdf
   5. 
6. 
   7.  https://www.philstar.com/nation/2007/10/23/22988/samar-schools-consistent-strong-performers-nat

Islands of Eastern Samar